The 1931 VFL season was the 35th season of the Victorian Football League (VFL), the highest level senior Australian rules football competition in Victoria. The season featured twelve clubs, ran from 2 May until 10 October, and comprised an 18-game home-and-away season followed by a finals series featuring the top four clubs.

The premiership was won by the Geelong Football Club for the second time, after it defeated  by 20 points in the 1931 VFL Grand Final.

Premiership season
In 1931, the VFL competition consisted of twelve teams of 18 on-the-field players each, plus one substitute player, known as the 19th man. A player could be substituted for any reason; however, once substituted, a player could not return to the field of play under any circumstances.

Teams played each other in a home-and-away season of 18 rounds; matches 12 to 18 were the "home-and-way reverse" of matches 1 to 7.

Once the 18 round home-and-away season had finished, the 1931 VFL Premiers were determined by the specific format and conventions of the Page–McIntyre system. This was the first season to feature the new finals format, with the league predominantly using variations of the Argus System over the previous thirty seasons.

Round 1

|- bgcolor="#CCCCFF"
| Home team
| Home team score
| Away team
| Away team score
| Venue
| Crowd
| Date
|- bgcolor="#FFFFFF"
| 
| 11.17 (83)
| 
| 19.21 (135)
| Arden Street Oval
| 10,000
| 2 May 1931
|- bgcolor="#FFFFFF"
| 
| 8.13 (61)
| 
| 9.6 (60)
| Western Oval
| 12,000
| 2 May 1931
|- bgcolor="#FFFFFF"
| 
| 13.14 (92)
| 
| 12.15 (87)
| Victoria Park
| 16,000
| 2 May 1931
|- bgcolor="#FFFFFF"
| 
| 15.8 (98)
| 
| 14.23 (107)
| Princes Park
| 26,500
| 2 May 1931
|- bgcolor="#FFFFFF"
| 
| 15.16 (106)
| 
| 14.10 (94)
| MCG
| 19,330
| 2 May 1931
|- bgcolor="#FFFFFF"
| 
| 13.14 (92)
| 
| 11.14 (80)
| Junction Oval
| 19,000
| 2 May 1931

Round 2

|- bgcolor="#CCCCFF"
| Home team
| Home team score
| Away team
| Away team score
| Venue
| Crowd
| Date
|- bgcolor="#FFFFFF"
| 
| 20.6 (126)
| 
| 7.12 (54)
| Corio Oval
| 9,500
| 9 May 1931
|- bgcolor="#FFFFFF"
| 
| 12.5 (77)
| 
| 10.13 (73)
| Windy Hill
| 15,000
| 9 May 1931
|- bgcolor="#FFFFFF"
| 
|30.19.199
| 
| 4.7 (31)
| Punt Road Oval
| 11,000
| 9 May 1931
|- bgcolor="#FFFFFF"
| 
| 13.13 (91)
| 
| 16.15 (111)
| Lake Oval
| 20,000
| 9 May 1931
|- bgcolor="#FFFFFF"
| 
| 8.17 (65)
| 
| 11.18 (84)
| Glenferrie Oval
| 15,000
| 9 May 1931
|- bgcolor="#FFFFFF"
| 
| 13.15 (93)
| 
| 19.19 (133)
| Brunswick Street Oval
| 35,000
| 9 May 1931

Round 3

|- bgcolor="#CCCCFF"
| Home team
| Home team score
| Away team
| Away team score
| Venue
| Crowd
| Date
|- bgcolor="#FFFFFF"
| 
| 7.10 (52)
| 
| 13.16 (94)
| Western Oval
| 30,000
| 16 May 1931
|- bgcolor="#FFFFFF"
| 
| 13.16 (94)
| 
| 10.13 (73)
| Victoria Park
| 15,000
| 16 May 1931
|- bgcolor="#FFFFFF"
| 
| 18.18 (126)
| 
| 5.14 (44)
| Princes Park
| 20,000
| 16 May 1931
|- bgcolor="#FFFFFF"
| 
| 10.12 (72)
| 
| 10.8 (68)
| Junction Oval
| 14,000
| 16 May 1931
|- bgcolor="#FFFFFF"
| 
| 12.15 (87)
| 
| 11.17 (83)
| MCG
| 19,767
| 16 May 1931
|- bgcolor="#FFFFFF"
| 
| 6.12 (48)
| 
| 12.16 (88)
| Arden Street Oval
| 7,000
| 16 May 1931

Round 4

|- bgcolor="#CCCCFF"
| Home team
| Home team score
| Away team
| Away team score
| Venue
| Crowd
| Date
|- bgcolor="#FFFFFF"
| 
| 13.16 (94)
| 
| 16.13 (109)
| Glenferrie Oval
| 10,000
| 23 May 1931
|- bgcolor="#FFFFFF"
| 
| 10.15 (75)
| 
| 12.12 (84)
| Brunswick Street Oval
| 14,000
| 23 May 1931
|- bgcolor="#FFFFFF"
| 
| 12.13 (85)
| 
| 9.9 (63)
| Windy Hill
| 10,000
| 23 May 1931
|- bgcolor="#FFFFFF"
| 
| 18.19 (127)
| 
| 16.10 (106)
| Lake Oval
| 18,000
| 23 May 1931
|- bgcolor="#FFFFFF"
| 
| 10.12 (72)
| 
| 9.14 (68)
| Punt Road Oval
| 40,000
| 23 May 1931
|- bgcolor="#FFFFFF"
| 
| 11.14 (80)
| 
| 11.8 (74)
| Corio Oval
| 12,500
| 23 May 1931

Round 5

|- bgcolor="#CCCCFF"
| Home team
| Home team score
| Away team
| Away team score
| Venue
| Crowd
| Date
|- bgcolor="#FFFFFF"
| 
| 11.10 (76)
| 
| 11.13 (79)
| Glenferrie Oval
| 11,000
| 30 May 1931
|- bgcolor="#FFFFFF"
| 
| 10.12 (72)
| 
| 11.20 (86)
| Windy Hill
| 15,000
| 30 May 1931
|- bgcolor="#FFFFFF"
| 
| 16.11 (107)
| 
| 13.13 (91)
| Princes Park
| 35,000
| 30 May 1931
|- bgcolor="#FFFFFF"
| 
| 13.19 (97)
| 
| 7.10 (52)
| Junction Oval
| 10,000
| 30 May 1931
|- bgcolor="#FFFFFF"
| 
| 13.9 (87)
| 
| 10.11 (71)
| MCG
| 20,244
| 30 May 1931
|- bgcolor="#FFFFFF"
| 
| 20.22 (142)
| 
| 12.9 (81)
| Corio Oval
| 9,000
| 30 May 1931

Round 6
Round 6 was a split round, but the two-halves of the round were unusually played almost three weeks apart. Three matches played on King's Birthday Monday (8 June), and the other three matches played Saturday 27 June – the Saturday between Rounds 8 and 9. This means that six teams played their Round 7 and 8 matches before their Round 6 match.

|- bgcolor="#CCCCFF"
| Home team
| Home team score
| Away team
| Away team score
| Venue
| Crowd
| Date
|- bgcolor="#FFFFFF"
| 
| 15.10 (100)
| 
| 10.17 (77)
| Victoria Park
| 16,000
| 8 June 1931
|- bgcolor="#FFFFFF"
| 
| 7.17 (59)
| 
| 15.8 (98)
| Arden Street Oval
| 7,000
| 8 June 1931
|- bgcolor="#FFFFFF"
| 
| 6.8 (44)
| 
| 13.15 (93)
| Lake Oval
| 30,000
| 8 June 1931
|- bgcolor="#FFFFFF"
| 
| 9.15 (69)
| 
| 8.10 (58)
| Punt Road Oval
| 19,000
| 27 June 1931
|- bgcolor="#FFFFFF"
| 
| 7.14 (56)
| 
| 10.10 (70)
| Brunswick Street Oval
| 12,000
| 27 June 1931
|- bgcolor="#FFFFFF"
| 
| 8.8 (56)
| 
| 8.11 (59)
| Western Oval
| 24,000
| 27 June 1931

Round 7

|- bgcolor="#CCCCFF"
| Home team
| Home team score
| Away team
| Away team score
| Venue
| Crowd
| Date
|- bgcolor="#FFFFFF"
| 
| 12.15 (87)
| 
| 8.12 (60)
| Corio Oval
| 18,250
| 13 June 1931
|- bgcolor="#FFFFFF"
| 
| 13.8 (86)
| 
| 5.13 (43)
| Western Oval
| 11,000
| 13 June 1931
|- bgcolor="#FFFFFF"
| 
| 14.14 (98)
| 
| 16.15 (111)
| Brunswick Street Oval
| 12,000
| 13 June 1931
|- bgcolor="#FFFFFF"
| 
| 8.12 (60)
| 
| 12.8 (80)
| Windy Hill
| 10,000
| 13 June 1931
|- bgcolor="#FFFFFF"
| 
| 7.12 (54)
| 
| 10.11 (71)
| MCG
| 26,436
| 13 June 1931
|- bgcolor="#FFFFFF"
| 
| 8.11 (59)
| 
| 12.18 (90)
| Junction Oval
| 24,000
| 13 June 1931

Round 8

|- bgcolor="#CCCCFF"
| Home team
| Home team score
| Away team
| Away team score
| Venue
| Crowd
| Date
|- bgcolor="#FFFFFF"
| 
| 12.12 (84)
| 
| 7.15 (57)
| Punt Road Oval
| 18,000
| 20 June 1931
|- bgcolor="#FFFFFF"
| 
| 7.13 (55)
| 
| 13.11 (89)
| Windy Hill
| 10,000
| 20 June 1931
|- bgcolor="#FFFFFF"
| 
| 22.22 (154)
| 
| 9.10 (64)
| Victoria Park
| 6,000
| 20 June 1931
|- bgcolor="#FFFFFF"
| 
| 18.14 (122)
| 
| 9.4 (58)
| Princes Park
| 25,000
| 20 June 1931
|- bgcolor="#FFFFFF"
| 
| 7.10 (52)
| 
| 11.11 (77)
| Junction Oval
| 17,000
| 20 June 1931
|- bgcolor="#FFFFFF"
| 
| 12.8 (80)
| 
| 7.14 (56)
| Glenferrie Oval
| 8,000
| 20 June 1931

Round 9

|- bgcolor="#CCCCFF"
| Home team
| Home team score
| Away team
| Away team score
| Venue
| Crowd
| Date
|- bgcolor="#FFFFFF"
| 
| 4.12 (36)
| 
| 9.9 (63)
| MCG
| 15,826
| 4 July 1931
|- bgcolor="#FFFFFF"
| 
| 13.9 (87)
| 
| 9.7 (61)
| Corio Oval
| 9,500
| 4 July 1931
|- bgcolor="#FFFFFF"
| 
| 8.13 (61)
| 
| 14.17 (101)
| Brunswick Street Oval
| 15,000
| 4 July 1931
|- bgcolor="#FFFFFF"
| 
| 10.13 (73)
| 
| 9.9 (63)
| Lake Oval
| 11,000
| 4 July 1931
|- bgcolor="#FFFFFF"
| 
| 4.16 (40)
| 
| 6.8 (44)
| Western Oval
| 21,500
| 4 July 1931
|- bgcolor="#FFFFFF"
| 
| 7.8 (50)
| 
| 20.10 (130)
| Arden Street Oval
| 10,000
| 4 July 1931

Round 10

|- bgcolor="#CCCCFF"
| Home team
| Home team score
| Away team
| Away team score
| Venue
| Crowd
| Date
|- bgcolor="#FFFFFF"
| 
| 14.12 (96)
| 
| 3.6 (24)
| Glenferrie Oval
| 4,000
| 11 July 1931
|- bgcolor="#FFFFFF"
| 
| 8.10 (58)
| 
| 12.18 (90)
| Brunswick Street Oval
| 11,000
| 11 July 1931
|- bgcolor="#FFFFFF"
| 
| 8.18 (66)
| 
| 7.11 (53)
| Punt Road Oval
| 11,000
| 11 July 1931
|- bgcolor="#FFFFFF"
| 
| 7.10 (52)
| 
| 3.5 (23)
| Corio Oval
| 9,000
| 11 July 1931
|- bgcolor="#FFFFFF"
| 
| 12.9 (81)
| 
| 8.9 (57)
| Windy Hill
| 10,000
| 11 July 1931
|- bgcolor="#FFFFFF"
| 
| 10.12 (72)
| 
| 11.11 (77)
| Lake Oval
| 16,000
| 11 July 1931

Round 11

|- bgcolor="#CCCCFF"
| Home team
| Home team score
| Away team
| Away team score
| Venue
| Crowd
| Date
|- bgcolor="#FFFFFF"
| 
| 4.7 (31)
| 
| 12.10 (82)
| MCG
| 15,258
| 18 July 1931
|- bgcolor="#FFFFFF"
| 
| 14.20 (104)
| 
| 8.10 (58)
| Victoria Park
| 12,000
| 18 July 1931
|- bgcolor="#FFFFFF"
| 
| 16.15 (111)
| 
| 5.8 (38)
| Princes Park
| 17,000
| 18 July 1931
|- bgcolor="#FFFFFF"
| 
| 6.12 (48)
| 
| 11.19 (85)
| Junction Oval
| 24,000
| 18 July 1931
|- bgcolor="#FFFFFF"
| 
| 9.10 (64)
| 
| 19.17 (131)
| Arden Street Oval
| 4,000
| 18 July 1931
|- bgcolor="#FFFFFF"
| 
| 8.10 (58)
| 
| 12.13 (85)
| Western Oval
| 19,000
| 18 July 1931

Round 12

|- bgcolor="#CCCCFF"
| Home team
| Home team score
| Away team
| Away team score
| Venue
| Crowd
| Date
|- bgcolor="#FFFFFF"
| 
| 11.11 (77)
| 
| 9.12 (66)
| Brunswick Street Oval
| 8,000
| 25 July 1931
|- bgcolor="#FFFFFF"
| 
| 15.14 (104)
| 
| 9.5 (59)
| Windy Hill
| 15,000
| 25 July 1931
|- bgcolor="#FFFFFF"
| 
| 13.16 (94)
| 
| 9.12 (66)
| Lake Oval
| 7,500
| 25 July 1931
|- bgcolor="#FFFFFF"
| 
| 8.5 (53)
| 
| 6.19 (55)
| Glenferrie Oval
| 8,000
| 25 July 1931
|- bgcolor="#FFFFFF"
| 
| 4.19 (43)
| 
| 4.6 (30)
| Corio Oval
| 15,000
| 25 July 1931
|- bgcolor="#FFFFFF"
| 
| 8.17 (65)
| 
| 6.12 (48)
| Punt Road Oval
| 36,000
| 25 July 1931

Round 13

|- bgcolor="#CCCCFF"
| Home team
| Home team score
| Away team
| Away team score
| Venue
| Crowd
| Date
|- bgcolor="#FFFFFF"
| 
| 9.15 (69)
| 
| 16.12 (108)
| Arden Street Oval
| 8,000
| 1 August 1931
|- bgcolor="#FFFFFF"
| 
| 9.14 (68)
| 
| 5.11 (41)
| Western Oval
| 18,500
| 1 August 1931
|- bgcolor="#FFFFFF"
| 
| 15.13 (103)
| 
| 7.16 (58)
| Victoria Park
| 9,000
| 1 August 1931
|- bgcolor="#FFFFFF"
| 
| 18.13 (121)
| 
| 13.11 (89)
| Princes Park
| 18,500
| 1 August 1931
|- bgcolor="#FFFFFF"
| 
| 7.10 (52)
| 
| 15.10 (100)
| Junction Oval
| 16,000
| 1 August 1931
|- bgcolor="#FFFFFF"
| 
| 11.6 (72)
| 
| 10.11 (71)
| MCG
| 13,828
| 1 August 1931

Round 14

|- bgcolor="#CCCCFF"
| Home team
| Home team score
| Away team
| Away team score
| Venue
| Crowd
| Date
|- bgcolor="#FFFFFF"
| 
| 11.9 (75)
| 
| 11.11 (77)
| Glenferrie Oval
| 8,000
| 8 August 1931
|- bgcolor="#FFFFFF"
| 
| 11.11 (77)
| 
| 6.9 (45)
| Corio Oval
| 9,250
| 8 August 1931
|- bgcolor="#FFFFFF"
| 
| 21.12 (138)
| 
| 8.12 (60)
| Brunswick Street Oval
| 8,000
| 8 August 1931
|- bgcolor="#FFFFFF"
| 
| 7.12 (54)
| 
| 10.18 (78)
| Punt Road Oval
| 25,000
| 8 August 1931
|- bgcolor="#FFFFFF"
| 
| 6.23 (59)
| 
| 8.13 (61)
| Lake Oval
| 14,000
| 8 August 1931
|- bgcolor="#FFFFFF"
| 
| 18.14 (122)
| 
| 11.22 (88)
| Windy Hill
| 20,000
| 8 August 1931

Round 15

|- bgcolor="#CCCCFF"
| Home team
| Home team score
| Away team
| Away team score
| Venue
| Crowd
| Date
|- bgcolor="#FFFFFF"
| 
| 6.18 (54)
| 
| 8.14 (62)
| Junction Oval
| 6,000
| 22 August 1931
|- bgcolor="#FFFFFF"
| 
| 6.10 (46)
| 
| 10.10 (70)
| Victoria Park
| 15,000
| 22 August 1931
|- bgcolor="#FFFFFF"
| 
| 5.9 (39)
| 
| 3.10 (28)
| Princes Park
| 18,000
| 22 August 1931
|- bgcolor="#FFFFFF"
| 
| 13.15 (93)
| 
| 2.6 (18)
| MCG
| 3,614
| 22 August 1931
|- bgcolor="#FFFFFF"
| 
| 10.12 (72)
| 
| 6.6 (42)
| Western Oval
| 8,000
| 22 August 1931
|- bgcolor="#FFFFFF"
| 
| 9.7 (61)
| 
| 11.17 (83)
| Arden Street Oval
| 4,000
| 22 August 1931

Round 16

|- bgcolor="#CCCCFF"
| Home team
| Home team score
| Away team
| Away team score
| Venue
| Crowd
| Date
|- bgcolor="#FFFFFF"
| 
| 7.8 (50)
| 
| 11.15 (81)
| Arden Street Oval
| 4,000
| 29 August 1931
|- bgcolor="#FFFFFF"
| 
| 10.12 (72)
| 
| 5.8 (38)
| Western Oval
| 12,000
| 29 August 1931
|- bgcolor="#FFFFFF"
| 
| 9.8 (62)
| 
| 9.22 (76)
| Brunswick Street Oval
| 8,000
| 29 August 1931
|- bgcolor="#FFFFFF"
| 
| 12.18 (90)
| 
| 9.5 (59)
| Lake Oval
| 4,500
| 29 August 1931
|- bgcolor="#FFFFFF"
| 
| 23.14 (152)
| 
| 15.11 (101)
| Punt Road Oval
| 16,000
| 29 August 1931
|- bgcolor="#FFFFFF"
| 
| 20.15 (135)
| 
| 10.14 (74)
| Victoria Park
| 20,000
| 29 August 1931

Round 17

|- bgcolor="#CCCCFF"
| Home team
| Home team score
| Away team
| Away team score
| Venue
| Crowd
| Date
|- bgcolor="#FFFFFF"
| 
| 18.15 (123)
| 
| 11.13 (79)
| MCG
| 3,944
| 5 September 1931
|- bgcolor="#FFFFFF"
| 
| 5.13 (43)
| 
| 13.21 (99)
| Glenferrie Oval
| 11,000
| 5 September 1931
|- bgcolor="#FFFFFF"
| 
| 16.12 (108)
| 
| 8.11 (59)
| Corio Oval
| 10,500
| 5 September 1931
|- bgcolor="#FFFFFF"
| 
| 15.7 (97)
| 
| 12.8 (80)
| Windy Hill
| 10,000
| 5 September 1931
|- bgcolor="#FFFFFF"
| 
| 6.14 (50)
| 
| 7.12 (54)
| Princes Park
| 39,000
| 5 September 1931
|- bgcolor="#FFFFFF"
| 
| 21.16 (142)
| 
| 20.8 (128)
| Junction Oval
| 17,000
| 5 September 1931

Round 18

|- bgcolor="#CCCCFF"
| Home team
| Home team score
| Away team
| Away team score
| Venue
| Crowd
| Date
|- bgcolor="#FFFFFF"
| 
| 18.19 (127)
| 
| 8.9 (57)
| Victoria Park
| 14,000
| 12 September 1931
|- bgcolor="#FFFFFF"
| 
| 10.6 (66)
| 
| 6.12 (48)
| Princes Park
| 25,000
| 12 September 1931
|- bgcolor="#FFFFFF"
| 
| 8.8 (56)
| 
| 11.17 (83)
| Punt Road Oval
| 15,000
| 12 September 1931
|- bgcolor="#FFFFFF"
| 
| 3.16 (34)
| 
| 5.13 (43)
| Arden Street Oval
| 9,000
| 12 September 1931
|- bgcolor="#FFFFFF"
| 
| 5.14 (44)
| 
| 10.14 (74)
| Lake Oval
| 4,500
| 12 September 1931
|- bgcolor="#FFFFFF"
| 
| 8.15 (63)
| 
| 9.12 (66)
| Glenferrie Oval
| 5,000
| 12 September 1931

Ladder

Finals

All of the 1931 finals were played at the MCG so the home team in the semi-finals and preliminary final is purely the higher ranked team from the ladder but in the Grand Final the home team was the team that won the preliminary final.

Semi-finals

Preliminary final

Grand final

Grand final

Awards
 The 1931 VFL Premiership team was Geelong.
 The VFL's leading goalkicker was Harry "Soapy" Vallence of Carlton with 86 goals.
 In his first VFL season, and only 20 years old, the winner of the 1931 Brownlow Medal was Haydn Bunton, Sr of Fitzroy with 26 votes.
 North Melbourne took the "wooden spoon" in 1931.
Melbourne 8.13 (61) defeated  8.5 (53) in the Grand Final, played as a curtain-raiser to the firsts Grand Final on 10 October at the Melbourne Cricket Ground.

Notable events
 The VFL changed its Brownlow Medal voting procedure. The field umpire now voted for the three "fairest and best" on the ground in each match, casting 3, 2, and 1 votes. If there was a tie, the player with the most "3" votes would be declared the winner, then the most "2" votes. A player who had been suspended during the year should now be considered ineligible for the medal. 
 The VFL altered the manner in which it determined its premiership team. Abandoning the "amended Argus systems" that had operated from 1902 to 1930 (except in 1924), the VFL instituted the Page–McIntyre system which, amongst other innovations, guaranteed that there would be a "Grand Final" at the end of every season (this system continued to operate until 1972).
Prior to the season, the VFL and the Grounds Management Association (which represented the operators of most of the VFL grounds) entered a dispute over the use of the grounds for football matches. The dispute covered financial arrangements and the demarcation between the football and cricket seasons. After arbitration from the Minister for Lands, it was agreed that cricket clubs would be required to pay the league £20 per 100 members, ending the long-standing practice of cricket club members receiving admission to football games without compensation to the football clubs; but that the grounds management would still retain all receipts for admission to reserve areas, with the league receiving none of these takings. During the stand-off, the VFL arranged for the Motordrome and the Exhibition Oval to be available to serve as alternative venues during the year, and drew up a fixture which saw each of those grounds holding twelve games – with Fitzroy, Carlton, North Melbourne, St Kilda, Collingwood and Essendon each to have played four of their nine home games at one of the replacement grounds.
 In round 2, Richmond set the record for highest score in a game, scoring 30.19 (199) against . This beat South Melbourne's 1919 record by ten points, and remained unbeaten until 1969.
 In round 12, Carlton rover Tommy Downs was reported for kicking Richmond captain Maurie Hunter; despite the efforts of future Australian Prime Minister R. G. Menzies, KC, Downs was suspended for the remainder of the 1931 season and the whole of the 1932 season.
 In the first semi-final, Carlton thrashed Collingwood 20.10 (130) to 5.12 (42). Harry "Soapy" Vallence, at full-forward for Carlton kicked a (Finals) record 11 goals, including six in the last quarter. Vallance would have had 12 goals if his last shot (the last kick in the match) had not hit the goal-post, and only counted as a "behind".
 The round 17 match between St Kilda and Collingwood was the first in which both sides scored twenty goals. Both Bill Mohr and Gordon Coventry kicked eleven goals. Coventry was the first to kick ten for a losing side.

Footnotes

References
 Hogan, P., The Tigers of Old, The Richmond Football Club, (Richmond), 1996. 
 Rogers, S. & Brown, A., Every Game Ever Played: VFL/AFL Results 1897–1997 (Sixth Edition), Viking Books, (Ringwood), 1998. 
 Ross, J. (ed), 100 Years of Australian Football 1897–1996: The Complete Story of the AFL, All the Big Stories, All the Great Pictures, All the Champions, Every AFL Season Reported, Viking, (Ringwood), 1996.

External links
 1931 Season – AFL Tables
 1931 VFL v VFA Match – BoylesFootballPhotos

Australian Football League seasons
Vfl season